Eilema nebuliferella is a moth of the subfamily Arctiinae. It was described by Embrik Strand in 1922. It is found in Malawi.

References

Endemic fauna of Malawi
nebuliferella
Moths described in 1922
Lepidoptera of Malawi
Moths of Africa